Jame Jam TV is one of three television channels airing programs for Iranians living outside Iran. The channel broadcasts TV series which are shown domestically in Iran. The channel was originally consisting of three channels under the Jame Jam branding, each broadcasting to a different part of the world; Jame Jam 1 broadcasting to Europe, Jame Jam 2 broadcasting to North America, and Jame Jam 3 broadcasting to Asia and Oceania. From 17 January 2015, the three channels merged as a single channel.

As of 2019 it broadcasts via satellite on Galaxy 19 97°W (for North America), Hot Bird 13°E (for Europe), Badr 5 26°E (for Iran & Central/South/West Asia).

It should not be confused with the California-based Jaam-e-Jam channel which was created by Iranians who left after the revolution.
Hassan Maleki is the current manager of the channel.

References

External links
 
Official Web Site of Jame Jam (Persian)

Persian-language television stations
Islamic Republic of Iran Broadcasting
Television channels and stations established in 1997